Hiroko Mochizuki (born 23 July 1975) is a Japanese former professional tennis player.

As a junior, Mochizuki was ranked in the world's top 10 and was a runner-up in two junior grand slam doubles finals, at the 1993 Wimbledon and 1993 US Open, both partnering Yuka Yoshida.

Mochizuki, a right-handed player, competed on the professional tour from 1993 to 1999. She featured in the occasional WTA Tour event but played mostly in ITF tournaments, where she won seven doubles titles.

ITF finals

Singles: 1 (0–1)

Doubles: 14 (7–7)

References

External links
 
 

1975 births
Living people
Japanese female tennis players
20th-century Japanese women
21st-century Japanese women